NK Slavonac is a Croatian football club based in a village Stari Perkovci in Slavonia.

Honours 

 Treća HNL – East:
Winners (1): 2006–07

External links

Football clubs in Croatia
Football clubs in Brod-Posavina County
Association football clubs established in 1950
1950 establishments in Croatia